Karamalahi (also Romanized as Karamālahī, Karam Allāhī, Karamelāhī, and Karamollāh) is a village in Khaveh-ye Shomali Rural District, in the Central District of Delfan County, Lorestan Province, Iran. At the 2006 census, its population was 205, in 46 families.

References 

Towns and villages in Delfan County